Penmarch is a commune in the Finistère department of Brittany, northwestern France. It lies 18 km south-west of Quimper by road.

Geography
Penmarch is the southwest-most township of Pays Bigouden, at the southern end of the Bay of Audierne. It is part of the canton of Pont-l'Abbé, and of the arrondissement of Quimper.
 
The territory of the town (16.39 km2) is particularly flat; its altitude ranges from -1 to 23 m amsl. There are many marshy lagoons, some of which have been drained and filled, especially in St. Guénolé to save space or habitat for the installation of local handicrafts.
 
The municipality consists of four villages:

 Penmarch-Bourg, formerly known as the Tréoultré;
 Saint-Guénolé (main fishing port);
 Kerity (fishing port side moving towards the hosting of the craft);
 Saint-Pierre (port for very small craft).
 
Many islands or reefs of very variable dimensions punctuate the coast of Penmarch; the most important are the Étocs islets south of Kerity, and the island of Saint-Nonna west of Saint-Pierre.
 
The port of Saint-Guénolé has a pass opening due west, thought to be dangerous in rough weather. It is protected by two granite peninsulas: Krugen in the South, and Conq in the northwest. Krugen is connected to the mainland by a sandy isthmus. Conq is connected to the shore by an artificial embankment itself protected by concrete blocks to better break the flood wave.
 
The rocky granite coast (called "savage coast" in Saint-Guénolé) is interspersed with several beaches:
 North, the beach of Pors Carn-which extends to the tip of the torch (joint Plomeur);
 West, the beach of Joy;
 South, the beach Steir Kerity which begins at and continues through Guilvinec.

Climate
Penmarch has a climate bordering between Mediterranean (Köppen Csb) and oceanic (Cfb). It is heavily moderated by the Atlantic Ocean and the Gulf Stream influence, resulting in cool summers and very mild winters for the latitude as seasonal differences are low.

History

On the extremity of the peninsula on which Penmarc'h is situated are the fortified remains of a town which was of considerable importance from the 14th to the 16th centuries and included, besides Penmarc'h, Saint-Guénolé and Kerity. It owed its prosperity to its cod banks, the disappearance of which together with the discovery of the Newfoundland cod banks and the pillage of the place by the bandit La Fontenelle in 1595, contributed to its decline.

The church of Saint Nouna, a Gothic building of the early 16th century at Penmarc'h, and the church of St. Guénolé, an unfinished tower, and the church of Kerity are of interest. The coast is known to be very dangerous for sailors. There are numerous megalithic monuments in the vicinity.

Population

Inhabitants of Penmarch are called in French Penmarchais.

Sights
Penmarch is home to the 'Droguen' rock.

Literary references
Dorigen, the female protagonist in Geoffrey Chaucer's The Franklin's Tale, has a name similar to the local rock, which may symbolise her obduracy..

See also
Communes of the Finistère department
The Penmarch monument aux morts has sculpture by Pierre Charles Lenoir
The Penmarch serves as a landing point for SEA-ME-WE 3, the longest submarine cable on Earth

References

Further reading
 Couliou, Jean-René (1997) La Pêche bretonne. 446 p. Rennes: Presses Universitaires de Rennes
 Foyer de l'enseignement (1950) Grandeurs ... au pays de Penmarc'h: terre et mer. 58 p. Les Amitiés de Lorraine et d'Alsace
 Le Gallo, Yves (ed.) (1991) Le Finistère de la Préhistoire à nos jours. Ed. Bordessoules
 Quaghebeur, Joëlle (2001) La Cornouaille du e au e siècle. Société archéologique du Finistère
 Dubois, Xavier (2002) « La Crise sardinière et les Mutations de la conserverie », in: Humbert,  M., ed. La Bretagne à l'heure de la mondialisation. Rennes: Presses Universitaire de Rennes; pp. 27–33
 Duigou, Serge, et al. (2003) Histoire du Pays bigouden. Ed. Palantines
 Dreyer, Francis & Fichou, Jean-Christophe (2005) L'histoire de tous les phares de France. 316 p. Ouest-France ; pp. 179–182

External links

Official website 

Communes of Finistère
Finistère communes articles needing translation from French Wikipedia
Populated coastal places in France